Vitalij Aab (born November 14, 1979, in Karaganda, Soviet Union) is a German ice hockey player who is currently playing for Höchstadter EC in the German Oberliga.

Playing career
Vitalij Aab's professional debut was at the age of 17 for EC Wilhelmshaven. In his second season, he scored 28 points. In 1999, he was promoted into the second division with Wilhelmshaven. Two years later, he transferred to the Nürnberg Ice Tigers, where he played for three years. During this time he played so well that the German national coach called him up to play for the German national ice hockey team. Aab had the worst season of his career in 2004–05 with the Adler Mannheim; he only scored 24 points in 48 games, and therefore received very little ice time at the end of the season.

He left Mannheim after only one season and switched to the Iserlohn Roosters. After struggling at first, Aab's performance improved dramatically. At the end of the season, he was the highest scorer in Germany. Before the 2006–07 season, he signed with the Hamburg Freezers.

Aab returned to the Ice Tigers, now known as the Thomas Sabo Ice Tigers, in 2010.

Career statistics

Regular season and playoffs

References

External links

1979 births
Living people
Adler Mannheim players
German ice hockey forwards
Kazakhstani emigrants to Germany
Hamburg Freezers players
Iserlohn Roosters players
Nürnberg Ice Tigers players
Rote Teufel Bad Nauheim players
Russian people of German descent
Saryarka Karagandy players
Thomas Sabo Ice Tigers players